Koptev is a Russian masculine surname, its feminine counterpart is Kopteva. It may refer to
Genri Koptev-Gomolov (born 1926), Russian military officer
Yuri Koptev (born 1940), former director of the Russian Space Agency 

Russian-language surnames